The Southern Accent is the weekly student-run newspaper at Southern Adventist University. It was founded in 1926.

External links 

Student newspapers published in Tennessee
Publications established in 1926